Angelo Mariani or Ange-François Mariani (1838–1914) was a French chemist and entrepreneur from the island of Corsica. He was born in Pero-Casevecchie, Haute-Corse.

Career 
He is best known as the inventor of the first coca wine, Vin Mariani, in 1863. His contribution was to introduce the coca leaf indirectly to the general public. Mariani imported tons of coca leaves and used an extract from them in many products. It was Mariani's coca wine, though, that made him rich and famous. Mariani was also awarded with a medal of appreciation from Pope Leo XIII.

This tonic wine has been described as the ancestor of Coca-Cola.

References

BIBLIOGRAPHY
Aymon de Lestrange Coca Wine: Angelo Mariani’s Miraculous Elixir and the Birth of Modern Advertising, Park Street Press (VT), 2018

1838 births
1914 deaths
People from Haute-Corse
Burials at Père Lachaise Cemetery